Adams Commercial Historic District is a historic district located at Adams in Jefferson County, New York.  The district was listed on the National Register of Historic Places in 2006. It includes 21 contributing buildings and one contributing structure, encompassing the historic commercial core of the village of Adams.

References

Commercial buildings on the National Register of Historic Places in New York (state)
Historic districts on the National Register of Historic Places in New York (state)
Historic districts in Jefferson County, New York
National Register of Historic Places in Jefferson County, New York